Ancylite is a group of hydrous strontium carbonate minerals containing cerium, lanthanum and minor amounts of other rare-earth elements.

References

Carbonate minerals
Strontium minerals
Lanthanide minerals
Orthorhombic minerals
Minerals in space group 62